Antonio Eduardo Bermejo Nachura (June 13, 1941 – March 13, 2022) was a Filipino jurist who was an Associate Justice of the Supreme Court of the Philippines. He took his oath of office as Associate Justice on February 7, 2007, and occupied the position until his mandatory retirement on June 13, 2011. Previously, Nachura had been Solicitor-General of the Philippines at the time his appointment to the Court was announced on January 31, 2007, by then-Philippine President Gloria Macapagal Arroyo.

Background
Born in Catbalogan, Nachura was a graduate of the San Beda College of Law. He placed 7th in the 1967 bar examinations. In addition, he held a Doctor of Public Management from the Pamantasan ng Lungsod ng Maynila (University of the City of Manila).

From his years as a professor of law and a bar reviewer, Nachura has earned wide respect as an expert in political law. He was the Dean of the Arellano Law School from 1992 to 1994. He resigned as Dean in 1994 to accept an appointment as Undersecretary of the Department of Education, Culture and Sports.

Public life
In 1998, Nachura was elected congressman in the House of Representatives, representing the 2nd District of Samar. He served in the 11th Congress and the 12th Congress. He was an unsuccessful candidate for re-election to the 13th Congress.

In February 2006, Nachura was named Chief Presidential Legal Counsel by President Gloria Macapagal Arroyo. The following month, Nachura was appointed Solicitor-General on March 17, 2006, replacing Alfredo Benipayo. In his capacity as Solicitor-General, Nachura has represented the Republic of the Philippines in various cases pending before the courts, including such high-profile cases before the Supreme Court as the People's Initiative cases decided in October, 2006.

Personal life
Nachura died on 13 March 2022, at the age of 80.

Notes

External links
 I-site.ph info page
 Justice Antonio Eduardo B. Nachura (Official Supreme Court Webpage)

1941 births
2022 deaths
Associate Justices of the Supreme Court of the Philippines
Solicitors General of the Philippines
20th-century Filipino lawyers
Filipino educators
People from Catbalogan
Pamantasan ng Lungsod ng Maynila alumni
Members of the House of Representatives of the Philippines from Samar (province)
San Beda University alumni
Arroyo administration personnel
21st-century Filipino lawyers